George Pratt (1817–1894) was a missionary with the London Missionary Society who lived in Samoa for forty years from 1839 to 1879, mostly on the island of Savai'i. Pratt was from Portsea, Portsmouth in England.
He also served in Niue, the Loyalty Islands and New Guinea. In Samoa, Pratt lived at a mission station in Avao Matautu on the north coast of Savai'i island.

First Samoan Bible (1860) and dictionary (1862) 
Pratt was the first person to document the Samoan language. He authored the first grammar and dictionary of the language, A Grammar and Dictionary of the Samoan Language, with English and Samoan Vocabulary, which was first printed in 1862 at the Samoa Mission Press. Subsequent editions were published in 1876, 1893, and 1911. Reprints have been issued in 1960, 1977, and 1984.  In addition, the first Bible in Samoan was mainly the work of Pratt.  Indeed, during his "four decades in Samoa ... he worked almost daily on translating the Bible and revising his translation."

Samoan songs and myths 1891
He also collected Samoan songs and myths and translated them into a publication Some Folk-songs and Myths from Samoa, published in 1891. In this work is a section Samoan Custom: Analogous to those of the Israelites, where he wrote about cultural similarities including the importance of the number 7, embalming, natural eloquence, rod or staff of office, heads cut off in war, the use of slings and stones in war, possessions by evil spirits, the 'near sacred' relationships between brothers and sisters, calling the name of the chief who is to drink during ceremony, the giving of names and circumcision.

Pratt's valuable Samoan work records many old words of special interest - specialist terminology, archaic words and names in Samoan tradition. It contains sections on Samoan poetry and proverbs, and an extensive grammatical sketch.

References

English Protestant missionaries
Protestant missionaries in Samoa
Samoan historians
Historians of the Pacific
1817 births
1894 deaths
Translators of the Bible into Polynesian languages
19th-century translators
British expatriates in Samoa
British expatriates in Niue
British expatriates in Papua New Guinea
British expatriates in New Caledonia
19th-century historians
Protestant missionaries in Niue
Protestant missionaries in Papua New Guinea
Protestant missionaries in New Caledonia
Missionary linguists